Fang Xinfeng (born 21 July 1999) is a Chinese footballer currently playing as a defender for Qingdao Youth Island.

Club career
Fang Xinfeng was promoted to the senior team of Qingdao Huanghai within the 2018 China League One season and would make his debut in a Chinese FA Cup game against Sichuan Longfor F.C. on 11 April 2018 in a 3-0 defeat. This would be followed by his first league game on 6 October 2018 against Yanbian Funde F.C. in a 2-1 victory. He would go on to be a squad player that would aid the club to win the 2019 China League One division and promotion into the top tier.

Career statistics

Honours

Club
Qingdao Huanghai
China League One: 2019

References

External links

1999 births
Living people
Chinese footballers
Association football defenders
China League One players
Qingdao Hainiu F.C. (1990) players
Qingdao F.C. players